Consent to Treatment is the second album by Blue October. Pre-production sessions took place in Nashville with producer Blue Miller, and the final album recording sessions took place at Bay 7 Studios in Valley Village and Media Vortex in Burbank, California with producer Nick Launay. The album was released in the United States on August 15, 2000, by Universal Records. It is the band's first major-label album and their only album to feature former member Brant Coulter on guitar as well as their first album featuring Matt Noveskey. The opening track is a spoken poem written by Justin Furstenfeld and recited by Blue Miller. Ryan Smith sings the female backing vocals on "The Answer" and "Balance Beam."

The cover art was inspired by Peter Gabriel's music videos for "Sledgehammer" and “Digging in the Dirt”.

Matt Noveskey has said that Nick Launay was extremely nurturing in response to Noveskey's inquisitiveness during the Consent to Treatment production process, which was the impetus for Noveskey pursuing a career as a producer himself.

When performed live, the album tells a story of Justin Furstenfeld first falling in love with his girlfriend Amanda. However, while Justin is away recording Blue October's debut album, Amanda betrays Justin by sleeping with his friend James. Upon finding out, Justin is enraged and is committed to a mental hospital after threatening to kill James and himself. Justin is diagnosed with schizophrenia, and is prescribed medication and eventually released and finds closure and happiness through shedding codependency and expressing his emotions through musical performance.

Track listing
All tracks written by Justin Furstenfeld except for "James", cowritten with Matt Noveskey.

Personnel
 Justin Furstenfeld - lead vocals, guitar
 Brant Coulter - lead guitar
 Matt Noveskey - bass and acoustic guitars, backing vocals, sleeve art, 
 George Winston - piano
 Ryan Delahoussaye - violin, mandolin
 Eric Gorfain - violin
 Jane Scarpantoni - cello, string arrangements
 Jeremy Furstenfeld - drums
 Blue Miller - vocals, producer, mixing
 Ryan Smith - backing vocals
 Martin Klemm - assistant engineer
 David Ahlert - assistant engineer
 Kevin Page - assistant engineer
 Greg Archilla - production, mixing
 Nick Launay - producer, engineer, mixing
 Bob Ludwig - mastering

References

2000 albums
Blue October albums
Albums produced by Nick Launay
Universal Records albums